SAF-T (Standard Audit File for Tax) is an international standard for electronic exchange of reliable accounting data from organizations to a national tax authority or external auditors. The standard is defined by the Organisation for Economic Co-operation and Development (OECD). The file requirements are expressed using XML, but the OECD does not impose any particular file format, recommending that (para 6.28) "It is entirely a matter for revenue bodies to develop their policies for implementation of SAF-T, including its representation in XML. However, revenue bodies should consider data formats that permit audit automation today while minimising potential costs to all stakeholders when moving to new global open standards for business and financial data such as XBRL, and XBRL- GL in particular."

The standard is now increasingly adopted within European countries as a means to file tax returns electronically.

The standard was adopted in 2008 by Portugal and has since spread to other European countries, e.g. Luxembourg, Austria, Germany and France. From 1 January 2022 SAF-T is also rolled out in Romania, where large Romanian-resident companies and certain foreign companies.

Although SAF-T is formally standardized, both with respect to syntax (format) and semantics (meaning) to allow for and fulfill automatic data interchange and tools support, e.g. across country borders or common computerized systems, it does include some room for revenue bodies (tax administrations) to add individual elements, e.g. to cover special needs in a taxation or audit system. For example, in Portugal the SAF-T (PT) v1.04_01 standard – based on SAF-T v1.0 – includes some special elements and types relevant to the standard in Portugal.

Standards
In May 2005, the OECD Committee on Fiscal Affairs (CFA) published the first version of the SAF-T guidance. Version 1.0 was based on entries as found in a General Ledger Chart of Accounts, together with master file data for customers and suppliers and details of invoices, orders, payments, and adjustments. The standard describes a set of messages for data exchange between accounting software and national tax authorities or auditors. The syntax is proprietary and based on XML. There are multiple localized versions available which are compatible with the general v1.0 standard. Schema was originally defined in old DTD format – a precursor to today's XML Schema.

The revised version (2.0) extended the standard to include information on Inventory and Fixed Assets. The opportunity was also taken to enhance the original SAF-T specification to take account of suggestions from OECD member countries and others. Schema is changed to XML Schema format and new information covering Inventory and Fixed Assets added. The schema is not fully backward compatible with v1.0.

Country adoptions 

The following countries/organizations have laws adopting SAF-T:

See also 
 XBRL GL
 UN/CEFACT
 SIE (file format)

External links
 SAF-T v2.0 XML schema http://www.oecd.org/ctp/taxadministration/45167181.pdf
 OECD http://www.oecd.org
 XBRL
 UN/CEFACT
 SIE

References

 Saf-t para faturação Portuguese Edition, Edited 7 July 2019.

Data interchange standards
Accounting software